= Rafael Sáenz Rodríguez =

Costa Rican painter and consul (born 1977)

Rafael Sáenz Rodríguez (born February 22, 1977) is a Costa Rican painter. He was appointed as Consul of Costa Rica in Guayaquil, Ecuador on June 1, 2006.
